Bianca Leilua is a competitive sailor from Samoa who has represented Samoa at the Pacific Games and Pacific Mini Games. In 2015 she was Samoa's first female entrant in the Youth Sailing World Championships.

Life 
Leilua started sailing at the age of 9 in an Optimist, and began competing when she was 12 years old. She is the younger sister of Eroni Leilua.

Leilua is from Vaivase-uta in Apia. She was educated at Lynfield College in Auckland, New Zealand. In 2013 she represented Samoa at the Pacific Mini Games in Wallis and Fortuna, winning a silver medal. In 2015 she received a scholarship from World Sailing's Emerging Nations Programme and competed at the Youth Sailing World Championships. The same year, she competed at the Pacific Games in the Laser Radial event. In a field of 11 boats, Leilua finished fifth.

At the 2019 Pacific Games in Apia she won silver in the individual competition, and (alongside Vaimooia Ripley) gold in the team competition.

References

Living people
People from Apia
Samoan emigrants to New Zealand
Year of birth missing (living people)
Place of birth missing (living people)
Samoan female sailors (sport)

People educated at Lynfield College